OEL may refer to:

Organic Electro-Luminescence
Original English-language manga
Oracle Enterprise Linux, former name for Oracle Linux
Occupational exposure limit
Oxford English Limited
Oliver Ekman-Larsson (born 1991), Swedish professional ice hockey player